Karel Starý (born c. 1885 – death year unknown; birthplace unknown), was a Czech gymnast who competed in four World Championships. A mainstay of the Bohemian team through all of their appearances at every World Championship they attended prior to World War I, he helped his team to reach three out of four World Championship Team Titles (1907, 1911, 1913), and to Silver the other (1909), of the four times. He stamped himself as one of their best and one of the best in the world as during his final two appearances, he won all-around medals at both appearances, placing him among the top three gymnasts in the world at the time. After Starý's competitive career was over, he was a very reputable trainer of his fellow Czechoslovakian Sokol gymnasts.

References

Bohemian sportspeople
Male gymnasts
1880s births
Year of birth uncertain
Year of death unknown